Alessio Bax (born 1977 in Bari) is an Italian classical pianist. He graduated from the Bari conservatory at the record age of 14. He won the Hamamatsu International Piano Competition in Japan at age 19 and the Leeds International Pianoforte Competition in 2000 after first participating in 1993. Bax was a member of the Chamber Music Society of Lincoln Center's CMS Two for three seasons, beginning in 2009.  He also received the Avery Fisher Career Grant in 2009. He studied at Southern Methodist University in Dallas, Texas with Basque pianist Joaquín Achúcarro. Bax is a Steinway Artist. He also serves on the faculty of the New England Conservatory of Music as a professor of piano.

Career highlights
Bax has appeared as the soloist with the New York Philharmonic, Boston Symphony Orchestra, Royal Philharmonic Orchestra, London Philharmonic Orchestra, City of Birmingham Symphony Orchestra, Royal Liverpool Philharmonic, Royal Scottish National Orchestra, Dallas Symphony, Houston Symphony, Seattle Symphony, Orchestre National de Lille, Hungarian Symphony Orchestra, Tokyo Symphony, New Japan Philharmonic Orchestra, Minnesota Orchestra and St. Petersburg Philharmonic.  Bax has collaborated with conductors such as Marin Alsop, Vladimir Ashkenazy, Sir Andrew Davis, Yuri Temirkanov, Jaap van Zweden and Sir Simon Rattle. As a chamber music performer, Bax has performed with musicians such as Emanuel Ax, Joshua Bell, Emmanuel Pahud, Ian Bostridge, Daishin Kashimoto and the Emerson String Quartet

Bax has given recitals at major venues in Rome, Milan, Madrid, Paris, London, Tel Aviv, Tokyo, Seoul, Hong Kong, New York, Washington, Mexico City. Bax made his New York recital debut at the Metropolitan Museum of Art in 2010. Alessio Bax played the Fugue of Beethoven's "Hammerklavier" Sonata for Daniel Barenboim in the documentary Barenboim on Beethoven in 2005, published on EMI.

A track from his release "Bach Transcribed" on Signum Classics was used to great acclaim in the 2017 film "Call Me by Your Name" by director Luca Guadagnino

In addition to his solo career, Bax also performs with his wife, pianist Lucille Chung. They have shared stages at venues around the world and recorded successful albums together. Chung described playing duo with Bax: "It just needs to be at the right time, then we love to say yes, since we are a great team. There is total trust and…we think so much alike, we don’t even have to talk while rehearsing. We just know after a halt, where to come in again and how to communicate what we would like to happen. We think as a unit and that is advantageous for improving one’s security level within the repertoire. We feel free to take risks during performance and still are aware of the safety net, the complete support at the same time".

Bax is the artistic director of the Incontri in Terra di Siena Festival in Tuscany and co-artistic director with Lucille Chung of the Joaquín Achúcarro Foundation in Dallas.

Awards
In 2013 Bax received the Martin E. Segal Award from Lincoln Center, and the Andrew Wolf Chamber Music Award. In 2009, Bax received the Avery Fisher Career Grant,  and was the first prize winner of the 2000 Leeds International Pianoforte Competition. Bax also won the 1997 Hamamatsu International Piano Competition.

Personal life 
Alessio Bax lives in New York City with his wife, Lucille Chung and their daughter Mila, to whom the album "Lullabies for Mila" was dedicated.  In 2016, when Mila was not yet two, they were all featured together in a much loved episode of NPR's Tiny Desk Concerts.  In addition to being a pianist, Bax also loves cooking, hosting "epic" multi-course dinner parties, as chronicled by a 2013 New York Times article.

Discography 
On Signum Classics:
Italian Inspirations (Bach/Marcello, Rachmaninoff, Dallapiccola, Liszt)
Beethoven's Emperor Concerto and rare solo works
Poulenc (with Lucille Chung)
Lullabies for Mila
Scriabin/Mussorgsky
Alessio Bax plays Beethoven: Hammerklavier and Moonlight Sonatas, and transcriptions from the Ruins of Athens by A. Bax
Bax & Chung: Piano Four Hands (Brahms/Stravinsky/Piazzolla arr. Bax/Chung)
Alessio Bax plays Mozart: Piano Concertos K. 491 & K. 595 
Alessio Bax plays Brahms
Rachmaninov: Preludes & Melodies 
Bach Transcribed

On other labels: 
Baroque Reflections (Gramophone “Editor’s Choice” - Warner Classics, 2004)
Ligeti’s complete four-hand and two-piano works (Dynamic Records, 2003)
Carnival of the Animals with the Fort Worth Symphony (2005)
Marcel Dupré Complete works for Organ and Piano duo (Naxos, 1996)

References

External links

1977 births
Living people
Italian classical pianists
Male classical pianists
Italian male pianists
People from Bari
Prize-winners of the Leeds International Pianoforte Competition
Southern Methodist University alumni
Southern Methodist University faculty
21st-century classical pianists
21st-century Italian male musicians
21st-century Italian musicians